Rob Parker may refer to:

Rob Parker (councillor), British local politician
Rob Parker (sports journalist) (born 1964), American sports journalist
Rob Parker (rugby league) (born 1981), English rugby league footballer
Rob Parker (Canadian politician) (1943–2016), Progressive Conservative party member of the Canadian House of Commons

See also
Robert Parker (disambiguation)
Bob Parker (disambiguation)